Biezelinge is a neighbourhood of Kapelle and former village in the Dutch municipality of Kapelle (province of Zeeland).

The village is separated from Kapelle by a railroad. The two villages share a train station. In 1978, Biezelinge and Kapelle were considered a single village by the postal authorities. Since 2021, there are no longer specific statistics for Biezelinge.

History 
Biezelinge developed in the Late Middle Ages near a harbour. In 1717, the harbour was dammed by the construction of the Schenkeldijk.

The tower Dutch Reformed church was built between 1877 and 1878. In 1908, the medieval church was replaced by an aisleless church. The church is located on the former monastery Jerusalem.

Biezelinge was home to 516 people in 1840.

Transport
Railway station: Kapelle-Biezelinge.

People from Biezelinge 
 Jan Peter Balkenende (7 May 1956), Dutch Prime Minister

Gallery

References

External links

Populated places in Zeeland
Kapelle